Lake Townsen Regional Park is a park located in northeastern Hernando County, Florida, United States.  Although Hernando County Department of Parks gives the address as being in Brooksville, it is actually closer to Istachatta. The park occupies  and includes trails for jogging, hiking, bicycling, and horseback riding.  These trails connect with the Withlacoochee State Trail.  The park also has fields for baseball, basketball, volleyball and horseshoes as well a picnic areas and a playground.

References

Parks in Hernando County, Florida